Sarah Bryant may refer to: 
Sarah Bryant (British Army soldier) (née Feely, 1981–2008), British servicewoman who was killed in Afghanistan 
Sara Cone Bryant (1873–1956), American lecturer, teacher, writer
Sarah Bryant (Virtua Fighter), character from the Virtua Fighter series